Narenj Kelayeh (also Romanized as Nārenj Kelāyeh; also known as Nāranjkelāyeh) is a village in Layl Rural District, in the Central District of Lahijan County, Gilan Province, Iran. At the 2006 census, its population was 138, in 37 families.

References 

Populated places in Lahijan County